The Brighton International was a tennis tournament held in Brighton, UK. It was a WTA Tour event from 1978–1995 and an ATP Tour event from 1996-2000, upon the discontinuation of the women's tournament. The women's event was held in October.

It was competed on indoor carpet courts and was a WTA Tier II event prior to being removed from the tour. The men's event was held on outdoor clay in Bournemouth from 1996-1999, and in Brighton, on indoor hard courts in 2000.

Steffi Graf won the tournament a record 6 times. The only British winners were Sue Barker, who defeated Mima Jaušovec in 1981; and in the men's, Tim Henman, who beat Dominik Hrbatý in the final year of play.

Results

Women's singles

Women's doubles

Men's singles

Men's doubles

External links
 ATP Results Archive

 
Carpet court tennis tournaments
Clay court tennis tournaments
Hard court tennis tournaments
Indoor tennis tournaments
Tennis tournaments in England
ATP Tour
WTA Tour
Recurring sporting events established in 1978
Recurring sporting events disestablished in 2000
Defunct tennis tournaments in the United Kingdom
1978 establishments in England
2000 disestablishments in England